The following is a list of all currently recognized species within the genus Corvus (the crows and ravens).

Living species
Listed alphabetically.
 Corvus albus – pied crow (Central African coasts to southern Africa)
 Corvus albicollis – white-necked raven or Cape raven (southern, central, and eastern Africa)
 Corvus bennetti – little crow (Australia)
 Corvus brachyrhynchos – American crow (the United States, southern Canada and northern Mexico) 
 Corvus caurinus – northwestern crow (the Olympic Peninsula to southwestern Alaska)
 Corvus capensis – Cape crow or Cape rook (east and southern Africa)
 Corvus corax – common raven or northern raven (the Holarctic regions of the Northern Hemisphere)
 Corvus cornix – hooded crow (northern and eastern Europe and northern Africa) (Corvus corax cornix?)
 Corvus corone – carrion crow (Eurasia) 
 Corvus coronoides – Australian raven (eastern and southern Australia)
 Corvus crassirostris – thick-billed raven (Ethiopia)
 Corvus cryptoleucus – Chihuahuan raven (southwestern United States and northwestern Mexico)
 Corvus culminatus – Indian jungle crow (India and Sri Lanka)
 Corvus edithae – Somali crow (eastern Africa)
 Corvus enca – slender-billed crow (Malaysia, the Philippines, Borneo, Indonesia)
 Corvus florensis – Flores crow (Flores, Indonesia)
 Corvus frugilegus – rook (Eurasia, introduced to New Zealand) 
 Corvus fuscicapillus – brown-headed crow (New Guinea)
 Corvus hawaiiensis (formerly C. tropicus) – Hawaiian crow (Hawaii) 
 Corvus imparatus – Tamaulipas crow (Gulf of Mexico coast of Texas and northeastern Mexico)
 Corvus insularis – Bismarck crow (Bismark Archipelago, Papua New Guinea)
 Corvus jamaicensis – Jamaican crow (Jamaica)
 Corvus kubaryi – Mariana crow or aga (Guam and Rota, Northern Mariana Islands)
 Corvus leucognaphalus – white-necked crow (Hispaniola)
 Corvus levaillantii – eastern jungle crow (Indian subcontinent to the northern Malay Peninsula)
 Corvus macrorhynchos – large-billed crow (Himalayas, East Asia, the Malay Peninsula, Sunda Islands, and the Philippines)
 Corvus meeki – Bougainville crow or Solomon Islands crow (Bougainville Island and Shortland Islands, Solomon Islands)
 Corvus mellori – little raven (southeastern Australia)
 Corvus moneduloides – New Caledonian crow (New Caledonia)
 Corvus nasicus – Cuban crow (Cuba, Isla de la Juventud, Turks and Caicos Islands)
 Corvus orru – Torresian crow or Australian crow (Australia, New Guinea, Lesser Sunda Islands)
 Corvus ossifragus – fish crow (eastern United States coast)
 Corvus palmarum – palm crow (Cuba, Hispaniola)
Corvus pusillus – Palawan crow (Palawan, Philippines)
 Corvus rhipidurus – fan-tailed raven (eastern Africa, Middle East)
 Corvus ruficollis – brown-necked raven (north Africa, Arabian Peninsula, Iran, Central Asia, Pakistan)
 Corvus samarensis – small crow (Samar and Mindanao, Philippines)
 Corvus sinaloae –– Sinaloa crow (Pacific Coast of Mexico)
 Corvus splendens – house crow or Indian house crow (Indian subcontinent, Southeast Asia, Middle East, eastern Africa) 
 Corvus tasmanicus – forest raven or Tasmanian raven (Tasmania and adjacent southern coast of Australia)
 Corvus torquatus – collared crow (eastern China south into Vietnam) 
 Corvus tristis – grey crow or bare-faced crow (New Guinea and nearby islands)
 Corvus typicus – piping crow or Celebes pied crow (Sulawesi and Muna, Indonesia)
 Corvus unicolor – Banggai crow (Banggai Island, Indonesia)
 Corvus validus – long-billed crow (northern Moluccas, Indonesia)
 Corvus violaceus – violet crow (Seram, Indonesia) 
 Corvus woodfordi – white-billed crow or Solomon Islands crow (southern Solomon Islands)

Fossil forms 
   Corvus galushai – (fossil: Big Sandy Late Miocene of Wickieup, United States)
   Corvus larteti – (fossil: Late Miocene of France, or Central Europe?)
   Corvus praecorax – (fossil: Early Pliocene of Perpignan, France; possibly a subspecies of C. corone/cornix)
   Corvus simionescui – (fossil: Early Pliocene of Maluşteni-Bereşti, Romania; possibly a subspecies of C. corone/cornix)
   Corvus hungaricus – (fossil: Late Pliocene/Early Pleistocene of Southern Europe; tentatively placed here)
   Corvus moravicus – (fossil: Late Pliocene/Early Pleistocene of Central to Eastern Europe; possibly a subspecies of C. monedula)
   Corvus pliocaenus – (fossil: Late Pliocene –? Early/Middle Pleistocene of Europe; possibly a subspecies of C. corone/cornix)
   Corvus antecorax – (fossil: Late Pliocene – Late Pleistocene of Europe; may be C. janossyi, possibly a subspecies of C. corax)
  Corvus bragai – (fossil: Pliocene/Pleistocene transition of South Africa)
   Corvus betfianus – (fossil: Early Pleistocene of Betfi, Romania; possibly a subspecies of C. corone/cornix)
   Corvus fossilis – (fossil: Late Pleistocene Seveckenberg, Germany; probably a subspecies of C. corax)
   Corvus neomexicanus – (fossil: Late Pleistocene of Dry Cave, United States)
   Corvus antipodum – New Zealand raven (prehistoric: New Zealand)
   Corvus impluviatus – high-billed crow (prehistoric: Hawaii)
   Corvus moriorum – Chatham raven (prehistoric: the Chatham Islands, the southwestern Pacific)
   Corvus pumilis – Puerto Rican crow (prehistoric: Puerto Rico; possibly a subspecies of C. nasicus/palmarum)
   Corvus viriosus – robust crow (prehistoric: Hawaii)
   Corvus sp. – New Ireland crow (prehistoric: New Ireland, Melanesia)

The taxonomy of the C. antecorax/C. fossilis complex as well as the C. pliocaenus/C. betfianus/C. praecorax/C. simionescui, in particular the temporal succession and relationship to the living relatives, is not yet fully resolved. At least some of these "species" seem to have been direct ancestors of the living forms as listed above.

Former species
Formerly, some authorities also considered the following species (or subspecies) as species within the genus Corvus:
 Indian roller (as Corvus benghalensis)
 Indian paradise flycatcher (as Corvus paradisi)
 Magpie-lark (as Corvus cyanoleucus)
 Western jackdaw (as Corvus monedula) 
 Daurian jackdaw (as Corvus dauuricus) 
 Eurasian jay (as Corvus glandarius)

References

Corvus
Corvus